Robert Nichols (July 20, 1924 – March 21, 2013) was an American character actor, singer, and dancer. His television, theater and film career spanned more than seventy years.

Life and career
Robert Nichols was born in Oakland, California, the son of Edna (née Beemer) and Ray D. Nichols, a real estate broker. He began his career in entertainment as a student at Oakland High School. Nichols enlisted with the U.S. Army during World War II, performing with the Special Services to entertain U.S. troops during the war. He performed on domestic U.S. military bases and managed a jazz band in Japan during the post-war period.
 
Nichols was awarded a scholarship for the Royal Academy of Dramatic Art, a drama school in London, following World War II. He began performing on in theater while living in London. In 1949, Nichols made his film debut in I Was a Male War Bride, which was shot in West Germany. He was deported from the United Kingdom soon after because he did not have a British work permit.

In 1950, soon after his deportation, Nichols met his future wife, Jennifer, at her 19th birthday beach party near Malibu, California. They became engaged after two dates and were married just two months later. Jennifer Nichols later worked as a film wardrobe supervisor.

Nichols worked in American film and television throughout the 1950s. In the episode "Doc Holliday Rewrites History" of The Life and Legend of Wyatt Earp, Nichols played a traveling photographer and historian.

Nichols returned to the United Kingdom around 1960, where he appeared in British and European film, television and theater productions. Nichols moved back to Los Angeles, California, in 1965. He soon relocated to New York City, where he enjoyed a steady career on and off Broadway, notably the Broadway productions of The Man Who Came to Dinner, Man and Superman and Take Me Along.

Nichols and his wife purchased property to build a home in Occidental, Sonoma County, California, in 1991. He continued to act and perform until the early 2000s. His last theater role was in the musical Ragtime, appearing in Los Angeles, Chicago and Vancouver.

Nichols died from heart failure at his Occidental home on March 21, 2013, at the age of 88.

Filmography

Discography
Jerome Kern: Show Boat, conducted by John McGlinn, EMI, 1988

References

External links

1924 births
2013 deaths
American male film actors
American male stage actors
American male television actors
Alumni of RADA
People from Occidental, California
Male actors from Oakland, California
Military personnel from California
People deported from the United Kingdom
United States Army personnel of World War II